Justin Townes Earle (January 4, 1982August 20, 2020) was an American singer-songwriter and musician. After his debut, EP Yuma (2007), he released eight full-length albums. He was recognized with an Americana Music Award for Emerging Artist of the Year in 2009 and for Song of the Year in 2011 for "Harlem River Blues". His father is alternative country artist Steve Earle.

Early life
Earle grew up in South Nashville, Tennessee, with his mother, Carol Ann Hunter Earle. His father, Steve Earle, gave him his middle name in honor of his own mentor, singer and songwriter Townes Van Zandt. When Justin was two, his father left his family, but after Steve Earle became sober in 1994 he returned. Justin dropped out of school, occasionally touring with and working for his father, eventually moving to eastern Tennessee with other songwriters. Like his father, Earle battled addiction beginning in his early teens.

Career
Earle played in two Nashville bands: the rock band the Distributors and the ragtime and bluegrass combo the Swindlers. He spent some time as guitarist and keyboardist for his father's touring band the Dukes. He developed a hybrid style of music mixing folk, blues and country.

Albums 
In 2007, Earle released a six-song EP called Yuma. He signed a contract with Chicago's Bloodshot Records and released an album called The Good Life in 2008. In 2009, he released the album Midnight at the Movies. In 2010, he released the album Harlem River Blues, followed by the album Nothing's Gonna Change the Way You Feel About Me Now in 2012. From 2014 to 2017, Earle released a "family trilogy" of albums, comprising Single Mothers (2014), Absent Fathers (2015), and Kids in the Street (2017). His last album, The Saint of Lost Causes, was released in May 2019. Earle produced Wanda Jackson's album Unfinished Business in 2012.

Appearances 
Earle played the Grand Ole Opry in 2008, Historical WSM, South By Southwest (2008–2010, 2012), the historic Beacon Theatre (May 2009), Bristol Rhythm and Roots Reunion (September 2009), Bonnaroo (2009) Bumbershoot (2010), the East Coast Blues & Roots Music Festival (Byron Bay, New South Wales, Australia) in 2012, the Bowery Ballroom (March 2010), the Winnipeg Folk Festival (July 2008), and the Nelsonville Music Festival (2008 and 2011).

In 2009, Earle co-billed The Big Surprise Tour with Gillian Welch and David Rawlings, Old Crow Medicine Show, and The Felice Brothers.

In 2012, he appeared in an episode of the HBO television series Treme with his father.

Honors and distinctions 
In September 2009, Earle received an Americana Music Award for New and Emerging Artist of the Year.

In 2011, Earle received the Americana Music Award in the Song of the Year category for "Harlem River Blues". His album of the same name has been described as having a "gently flowing, urban Americana sound, with horns, organ and tangy electric guitar". That year he also contributed a cover of "Maybe Baby" on the 2011 tribute album Rave on Buddy Holly, and played Newport Folk Festival and the Hardly Strictly Bluegrass Festival.

Nothing's Gonna Change the Way You Feel About Me Now was listed at album number 37 on Rolling Stone's list of the top 50 albums of 2012, with the annotation as follows: "The son of country-rock renegade Steve Earle has grown into a songwriter to rival his dad."

Personal life
Earle began using drugs at age 12 and continued for many years. In his words, "I discovered very fast that my way of doing things was going to get me in trouble, and I kept going with it, because I believed the myth for a long time, and I believed I had to destroy myself to make great art."

He went to rehabilitation clinics nine times followed by periods of sobriety. He relapsed in September 2010 when he was involved in a fight with an Indianapolis club owner. He relapsed again in 2017.

Earle moved to New York City in 2009. He returned to Nashville for several years. He married Jenn Marie Maynard in 2013 and he and his wife lived on the West Coast. Their only child, a daughter named Etta, was born in June 2017.

Earle died on August 20, 2020, in Nashville, Tennessee, at the age of 38. His death was announced by his family on social media on August 23. The cause of death was not immediately announced, but Nashville police said they were investigating the death as a probable drug overdose. On December 1, 2020, Earle's family announced that he died from an accidental overdose of fentanyl-laced cocaine.

Discography

Albums

References

Other sources
Deming, Mark. "Justin Townes Earle Biography", CMT, AllMusic, March 25, 2008.
Ruehl, Kim. "2008 Americana Music Association Awards and Honors Winners", About.com, Folk Music Guide, September 18, 2008.
Jacobs, Justin. "Buddy Miller, John Fogerty, Justin Townes Earle Amongst Notable Winners at Americana Music Awards", Paste Magazine, September 21, 2009.

External links

 
 Earle at Vagrant Records
 Earle at Bloodshot Records
 Earle at NPR Music
 
 Earle collection at the Internet Archive's live music archive

1982 births
2020 deaths
21st-century American singers
Accidental deaths in Tennessee
American country singer-songwriters
American folk musicians
Americana Music Honors & Awards winners
Bloodshot Records artists
Cocaine-related deaths in Tennessee
Country musicians from Tennessee
Drug-related deaths in Tennessee
Earle musical family
Loose Music artists
New West Records artists
Singers from Nashville, Tennessee
Vagrant Records artists
Singer-songwriters from Tennessee